Keshari Lal Kureel (1924-25 April 2017) is an Indian politician and member of Ninth and Tenth Lok Sabha. He was also elected to Uttar Pradesh Legislative Assembly two times from Bhognipur assembly constituency of Kanpur Dehat district.

References

2017 deaths
India MPs 1989–1991
India MPs 1991–1996
Janata Dal politicians
1924 births
Lok Sabha members from Uttar Pradesh
People from Kanpur Dehat district
Uttar Pradesh MLAs 1967–1969
Bharatiya Lok Dal politicians
Samyukta Socialist Party politicians